Palombara Sabina is a town and comune in the Metropolitan City of Rome, Italy.

Main sights
Savelli-Torlonia Castle, built from the 11th century by the Ottaviani, a branch of the Crescentii family of Rome. Antipope Innocent III was arrested here in 1180. It was acquired by Luca Savelli, a nephew of pope Honorius III, in 1250, whence the current name. It was rebuilt  in the 16th century by Troilo Savelli, who commissioned his friend Baldassarre Peruzzi the frescoes which are still visible inside, including portraits of Roman famous men, allegories of the Liberal Arts and grotesque decorations. It is now home to a library, an exhibition of Roman statues found nearby Palombara in 2008, and a natural sciences museum.
Abbey of Saint John in Argentella
Church of Santa Maria Annunziata (14th century)
Church of St. Blaise (1101), in Romanesque style.
Convent of St. Michael, in rural Romanesque style. It was built over a Roman villa, of which traces of opus reticulatum remain.

References 

Cities and towns in Lazio